Michael Busch may refer to:

 Michael E. Busch (1947–2019), Speaker of the Maryland House of Delegates
 Michael P. Busch, hematologist
 Michael Busch (baseball) (born 1997), minor league baseball player
 Michael Busch (runner), short-course winner at the 1997 German Cross Country Championships
 Mike Busch (baseball) (born 1968), former player with the Los Angeles Dodgers
 Mike Busch (footballer) (born 1981), German football forward
 Mike Busch (American football) (born 1962), retired American football player